Banasa may refer to:
 Iulia Valentia Banasa, a Roman-Berber city in northern Morocco
 Banasa (bug), a shield bug genus in the tribe Pentatomini